Matthew Scott Stark (born January 21, 1965 in Whittier, California) is a former Major League Baseball catcher and designated hitter who played for two seasons.

He played five games for the Toronto Blue Jays during the 1987 season and eight games for the Chicago White Sox during the 1990 season. Also won a world series with the Florida Marlins as a coach.

Stark is now coaching baseball at Glen A. Wilson High School in Hacienda Heights, California.

External links

1965 births
Living people
American expatriate baseball players in Canada
Baseball players from California
Birmingham Barons players
Bridgeport Bluefish players
Chicago White Sox players
Florence Blue Jays players
Knoxville Blue Jays players
Major League Baseball catchers
Medicine Hat Blue Jays players
Midland Angels players
Minor league baseball managers
People from Hacienda Heights, California
People from Whittier, California
St. Paul Saints players
Toronto Blue Jays players
Vancouver Canadians players